

Standings

Fixtures and results
All times given below are in Central European Time.

Game 1

Game 2

Game 3

Game 4

Game 5

Game 6

Game 7

Game 8

Game 9

Game 10

Game 11

Game 12

Game 13

Game 14

External links
Standings

2014–15 Euroleague